"Say it ain't so, Joe." is a phrase attributed to a reporter speaking to Shoeless Joe Jackson about Jackson's admission that he cheated in the 1919 World Series.

Say it ain't so, Joe may also refer to:

 Say It Ain't So, Joe (opera), a 2009 opera about the 2008 United States Vice-Presidential debates
 "Say It Ain't So, Joe" (song), a 1975 song by  Murray Head

See also 
 Say It Ain't So (disambiguation)
 Say it isn't so (disambiguation)